The 2009–10 Austrian Cup (also Stiegl-Cup for sponsoring purposes) was the 76th season of Austria's nationwide football cup competition. It commenced with the matches of the preliminary round in July 2009 and concluded with the Final on 16 May 2010. The winners of the competition, Sturm Graz, qualified for the third qualifying round of the 2010–11 UEFA Europa League.

Preliminary round
The Preliminary Round involved 66 amateur clubs from all regional federations, divided into smaller groups according to the Austrian federal states. The draw for this round was conducted at Franz Horr Stadium in Vienna on 8 July 2009. Thirty-three matches were played between mid-July and 2 August 2009. The winners of these matches advanced to the first round.

|-
|colspan="3" style="background-color:#fcc;"|

|-
|colspan="3" style="background-color:#fcc;"|

|-
|colspan="3" style="background-color:#fcc;"|

|-
|colspan="3" style="background-color:#fcc;"|

|-
|colspan="3" style="background-color:#fcc;"|

|-
|colspan="3" style="background-color:#fcc;"|

|-
|colspan="3" style="background-color:#fcc;"|

|-
|colspan="3" style="background-color:#fcc;"|

|-
|colspan="3" style="background-color:#fcc;"|

|}

First round
The draw for this round was conducted on 4 August 2009. The draw involved the 33 winners of the preliminary round, the 22 professional teams from the 2009–10 Bundesliga and First League, and nine regional cup winners. The matches of this round were played on 14 and 15 August 2009.

|-
|colspan="3" style="background-color:#fcc;"|

|-
|colspan="3" style="background-color:#fcc;"|

|}

Second round
This round involved the 32 winners from the first round. These matches were played on 19 September 2009.

|-
|colspan="3" style="background-color:#fcc;"|

|-
|colspan="3" style="background-color:#fcc;"|

|-
|colspan="3" style="background-color:#fcc;"|

|}

1This match was abandoned in the 77th minute due to Grazer AK fans storming the pitch.

Third round
This round involved the 16 winners from the previous round. The matches were played on 9 and 10 March 2010.

|-
|colspan="3" style="background-color:#fcc;"|

|-
|colspan="3" style="background-color:#fcc;"|

|-
|colspan="3" style="background-color:#fcc;"|

|}

Quarter-finals
This round involved the eight winners from the previous round. These matches were played on 30 and 31 March 2010.

|-
|colspan="3" style="background-color:#fcc;"|

|-
|colspan="3" style="background-color:#fcc;"|

|}

Semi-finals
This round involved the four winners from the previous round. These matches took place on 20 and 21 April 2010.

|-
|colspan="3" style="background-color:#fcc;"|

|-
|colspan="3" style="background-color:#fcc;"|

|}

Final

See also
 2009–10 Bundesliga
 2009–10 First League

External links
 Official website 
 Austriasoccer.at page

References

2009
Cup
2009–10 domestic association football cups